Teresa Mary "Tessa" Tennant  ( Cormack; 29 May 1959 – 7 July 2018) was a British advocate of sustainable investment. She co-founded one of the UK's first green investment funds. She was a pioneer in the field of responsible investment and was described by The Economist in its obituary notice as "a giant of green finance."

Life and career 
Tennant was born in Bletchingley, Surrey, to John Cormack and Jean Davies. After attending Prior's Field School, Godalming, Tennant studied for a Human Environmental Studies degree at King's College London. Following her graduation, she worked for the Green Alliance in the early 1980s. Subsequently, Tennant co-founded the UK's first green investment fund, the Merlin (now Jupiter) Ecology Fund, in 1988.

During her career, Tennant helped lead and found several influential organisations for green and responsible investors including UKSIF, AsRIA and the Carbon Disclosure Project. Among many other roles, she served as a director of the Green Investment Bank.

During her career, Tennant was a pioneer in the field of responsible investment. She led the creation and was first Chair of the Association for Sustainable and Responsible Investment in Asia based in Hong Kong (ASrIA), and The Carbon Disclosure Project (CDP), which works with over 6,000 of the largest corporations in the world to reduce their carbon emissions.

Awards and honours
In June 2018, the Financial Times/IFC Transformational Business Awards presented Tennant with its inaugural Lifetime Achievement Award and announced that this award would be named after her in future.

She was awarded an OBE in recognition of her services to sustainable investment at Holyroodhouse in 2018.

Marriage and family
The then Teresa Cormack met Henry Lovell Tennant in South America during her gap year. He was the second son of Colin Tennant, 3rd Baron Glenconner and Anne Tennant, Baroness Glenconner, lady in waiting to Princess Margaret; the couple married in 1983 after four years together. Although they separated after two years, they did not divorce and remained close friends. Henry Tennant died from AIDS in 1990. The couple's son, Euan (born 1983), now manages The Glen, the Tennant family estate in the Scottish borders.

In 2007, she married Bill Staempfli, a New York-born architect.

Death
Tennant spent her last months at The Glen with her family, and died from ovarian cancer on 7 July 2018, aged 59.

A testimonial in The Economist paid tribute to her networking skills and ability to work with and influence diverse groups by describing her as "A rainmaker who cajoled the religious and made them greener."

References 

1959 births
2018 deaths
Alumni of King's College London
British environmentalists
Deaths from cancer in Scotland
Deaths from ovarian cancer
English women in business
Officers of the Order of the British Empire
People educated at Prior's Field School
Tennant family
20th-century English businesspeople
People from Tandridge (district)